"Power of Love/Love Power" is a single by American singer-songwriter Luther Vandross. It was released on April 9, 1991 as the lead single from his 1991 album of the same name. The hit song spent two weeks at number one on the US R&B chart, and peaked at number four on the US pop chart, becoming his biggest pop solo hit.

The song is a medley of two songs titled "Power of Love" and "Love Power." "Love Power" had been a minor hit in 1968 for the one-hit wonder R&B group The Sandpebbles. The Sandpebbles version of "Love Power" had made it number 22 on the Billboard Hot 100, and number 14 on the R&B singles chart.

In 1995, the song was re-recorded and released with remixes by Frankie Knuckles and Uno Clio.

American singer Donna Summer recorded a version of the song for the 2005 album So Amazing: An All-Star Tribute to Luther Vandross.

Critical reception
Stephen Thomas Erlewine from AllMusic picked the song as one of the "high points" of the album. Larry Flick from Billboard deemed it "a tasty blend of influences: pleasing pop melodies, funky guitars, gospel-tinged backing vocals, and (naturally) effective R&B vocals. Thoroughly satisfying." Ken Tucker from Entertainment Weekly said it is "as paradoxically playful and ambitious as its title." He added, "Here is a perfect example of the way pop improvisation can combine with technical precision to revitalize verbal clichés. In this case, Vandross has joined two different songs, both featuring gliding, colliding melodies that offer the singer an opportunity to apply his delicate tenor to witty, chanted variations on the songs' titles."

After the song was remixed in 1995, British magazine Music Week rated it four out of five, adding, "Not typical Luther, but sumptuous all the same. This upbeat groover, taken from the soul meister's new greatest hits album, has all the ingredients of a chart hit." Alan Jones commented, "The underlying melodic strength is surrendered to the rhythm, which takes the form of a brisk house beat. Vandross is a singer of great finesse and exercises like this do him no favours."

Track listings

US CD/12" Remix Single (12" Power Mixes)
 "Power of Love/Love Power" (Powerful Mix) — 7:55
 "Power of Love/Love Power" (Radio Edit) — 5:20
 "Power of Love/Love Power" (Love Dub) — 5:54

US CD/12" Remix Promo Single (12" Power Mixes)
 "Power of Love/Love Power" (Powerful Mix) — 7:55
 "Power of Love/Love Power" (Radio Edit) — 5:20
 "Power of Love/Love Power" (Power House Mix) — 8:32
 "Power of Love/Love Power" (Love Dub) — 5:54

12"Vinyl single
 "Power of Love/Love Power" - 4:15
 "I Wanted Your Love" - 5:38
 "Any Love" - 4:59

7"Vinyl single
 "Power of Love/Love Power" - 4:15
 "Power of Love/Love Power" (Instrumental) - 6:43

12"Vinyl Netherlands promo (The Frankie Knuckles Mixes)
 "Power Of Love (Love Power)" (The Absolutely Fabulous Mix) - 10:27
 "Power Of Love (Love Power)" (Franktified Mix) - 6:40
 "Power Of Love (Love Power)" (The Classic Instrumental) - 6:51

12"Vinyl UK promo (The Frankie Knuckles Mixes)
 "Power Of Love (Love Power)" (The Absolutely Fabulous Mix) - 10:27 	
 "Power Of Love (Love Power)" (The Radio Mix) - 4:15 	
 "Power Of Love (Love Power)" (Dance Radio Mix) - 6:28 	
 "Power Of Love (Love Power)" (Franktified Mix) - 6:40

12"Vinyl promo (Uno Clio Mixes)
 "Power Of Love (Love Power)" (Uno Clio Vocal Mix) - 7:50 	
 "Power Of Love (Love Power)" (Uno Clio Dub Mix) - 8:03 	
 "Power Of Love (Love Power)" (Uno Clio 7" Vocal Mix) - 4:18 	

12"Vinyl Austria single
 "Power Of Love / Love Power" (The Absolutely Fabulous Club Mix) - 10:27
 "Power Of Love / Love Power" (The Franktified Mix) - 6:40
 "Power Of Love / Love Power" (Uno Clio Main Vocal Remix) - 7:50 	
 "Power Of Love / Love Power" (Colin Peter & Carl Ward 12" Remix) - 6:06 	
 "Power Of Love / Love Power" (The Classic Instrumental) - 6:51

US, UK, CD maxi single
 "Power Of Love / Love Power" (The Frankie Knuckles Radio Remix) - 4:15
 "Power Of Love / Love Power" (Original Version - Radio Edit) - 4:15
 "Power Of Love / Love Power" (Uno Clio 7" Vocal Remix) - 4:18
 "Power Of Love / Love Power" (Colin Peter & Carl Ward 7" Vocal) - 4:25
 "Power Of Love / Love Power" (The Dance Radio Mix) - 6:28
 "Power Of Love / Love Power" (The Absolutely Fabulous Club Mix) - 10:27
 "Power Of Love / Love Power" (The Power Reprise) - 3:37

Donna Summer tribute single
 "Power Of Love" (Hani's Extended Mix) - 6:41
 "Power Of Love" (Radio Mix/LP Version) - 3:29
 "Power Of Love" (Hani's Mixshow Edit) - 5:45
 "Power Of Love" (Power Keys) - 1:10
 "Power Of Love" (Hani's Mixshow Instrumental) - 5:44

Charts

Weekly charts

Year-end charts

See also
List of number-one R&B singles of 1991 (U.S.)

References

1991 singles
Luther Vandross songs
1991 songs
Songs written by Luther Vandross
Songs written by Marcus Miller
Music medleys